Mykolaivka is a rural settlement (selyshche) in Sievierodonetsk Raion (district) in Luhansk Oblast of eastern Ukraine.

Geography 
Mykolaivka located at about  WNW from the centre of Luhansk city, at about  SW from Sievierodonetsk.

Demographics
As of 2001 it had a population of 403 people. Native language as of the Ukrainian Census of 2001:
 Ukrainian — 87,1%
Russian — 12,41%
 Other language —  0,49%

Russo-Ukrainian War
The settlement came under attack by Russian forces during the Russian invasion of Ukraine in 2022. On 5 June of that year, the Russian general Roman Kutuzov was killed in Mykolaivka by Ukrainian forces.

References

Rural settlements in Luhansk Oblast